Akinshin (masculine) or Akinshina (feminine) is a Russian surname. Notable people with the surname include:

Oksana Akinshina (born 1987), Russian actress

Russian-language surnames